Catrina Raiford is an American woman who was once considered to be the heaviest woman in the world, weighing  on a  frame.

Her family placed her for eight months in a psychiatric home. As an adult, Raiford continued to gain weight. Unable to deal with her emotional issues, she eventually lost her job and moved back in with her mother.

Raiford became known as the 'Half Tonne Woman' before she lost half her body weight. She was inspired to do that in December 2003, when she had to be “bulldozed out of [her] house” after calling for help due to breathing difficulties. For five years until that point she had been bedridden.

References

Living people
Year of birth missing (living people)